Utetheisa inconstans is a moth in the family Erebidae. It was described by Arthur Gardiner Butler in 1880. It is found in Japan (Tokunoshima, Okinawa, Iriomote, Minami) and Taiwan.

References

Moths described in 1880
inconstans